Darwiniothamnus alternifolius is a species of flowering plant in the family Asteraceae.
It is found only in the Galápagos Islands.

References

Sources

alternifolius
Flora of Ecuador
Vulnerable plants
Taxonomy articles created by Polbot